BRP Benguet (LS-507) is a  currently serving the Philippine Navy.

Formerly known as USS Daviess County (LST-692), it was an  built for the United States Navy during World War II. Named after counties in Indiana, Kentucky, and Missouri, she was the only U.S. Naval vessel to bear the name. She served in World War II and during the Korean War. The US Government transferred Daviess County to the Philippine Navy in 1976, which renamed her BRP Benguet (LT-507). A new classification system implemented in April 2016 changed her hull number from LT-507 to LS-507.

Service history

United States service
LST-692 was laid down on 7 February 1944 at Jeffersonville, Indiana, by the Jeffersonville Boat & Machine Company; launched on 31 March 1944; sponsored by Mrs. Alma D. Voelker; and commissioned on 10 May 1944.

During World War II, LST-692 was assigned to the European Theater and participated in the invasion of southern France in August and September, 1944. Decommissioned in 1946, she was placed in the reserve fleet at Green Cove Springs, Florida until reactivated in 1951. She performed active service during the Korean War and thereafter. LST-692 was redesignated USS Daviess County (LST-692) on 1 July 1955.

LST-692 earned one battle star for World War II service and two battle stars for Korean service.

Daviess County was struck from the Naval Vessel Register on 1 June 1964 and transferred to the Military Sea Transportation Service (MSTS) where she operated as T-LST-692.

Philippine service
The US Government transferred Daviess County to the Philippine Navy on 13 September 1976, which renamed her to BRP Benguet (LT-507). In 1999, the Philippines stationed Benguet on Scarborough Shoal. China then urged the Philippines to remove her, and the Philippines immediately replied that it would do so. However, the Philippines only removed BRP Benguet from Scarborough Shoal shortly before the official visit of Chinese Premier Zhu Rongji to Manila. After the Philippines removed BRP Benguet, she went aground again on Pag-asa Island in 2004, but was removed again and still serves the Philippine Navy today.

The BRP Gregorio del Pilar was eventually pulled out from the shoal a couple of days later.

References

 
 

World War II amphibious warfare vessels of the United States
Ships transferred from the United States Navy to the Philippine Navy
Ships built in Jeffersonville, Indiana
1944 ships
LST-542-class tank landing ships
LST-542-class tank landing ships of the Philippine Navy